Eugoa malayicola is a moth of the family Erebidae. It is found in western Malaysia and Thailand.

References

 Natural History Museum Lepidoptera generic names catalog

malayicola
Moths described in 2008